The SPICE Arena is an indoor arena located in the township of Bayan Baru in Penang, Malaysia. It serves as Penang's main indoor sports centre as well as the preferred venue within the city-state for meetings, incentives, conferences and exhibitions (MICE).

Originally named the Penang International Sports Arena (PISA), the complex initially consisted of an indoor arena and a swimming centre. Since its completion in 2000, PISA has hosted national and international sports events, including the 2000 Sukma Games, the 2001 Southeast Asian Games and the 2013 Women's World Open Squash Championship.

Between 2011 and 2017, PISA underwent major renovation works conducted by S P Setia, a major Malaysian property developer. The refurbished indoor arena, renamed as the SPICE Arena, is now supplemented in its role as a MICE venue by the new RM284 million SPICE Convention & Exhibition Centre. In addition, the renovation project included the upgrading of the swimming centre, now known as the SPICE Aquatic Centre, which was completed in 2016.

History 
The Penang International Sports Arena (PISA), along with its adjacent aquatics centre, was completed in 2000 in time for the Sukma Games, a biannual national-level multi-sports tournament. At the time, PISA served as the venue for basketball and swimming events.

In the following year, PISA became the venue for the wushu and judo events of the 2001 Southeast Asian Games (SEA Games). PISA was one of the three SEA Games venues within Penang, while the majority of the other sporting events were held in Kuala Lumpur. Another international sports event that was held within PISA is the 2013 Women's World Open Squash Championship, which included among its participants Nicol David, the Penang-born squash player (and world number 1 at that point).

Renovation 
In 2011, a public-private partnership project was undertaken between the Penang Island Municipal Council (now Penang Island City Council) and SP Setia, a major Malaysian property firm, for the renovation and upgrading of PISA. SP Setia would bear most of the estimated RM300 million cost for the project, and would be given a 30-year concession to manage and maintain SPICE prior to its eventual handover to the Penang Island City Council.

A total of RM22 million was spent on the renovation of PISA, which was subsequently renamed the SPICE Arena. Renovation works had to be carried out intermittently, as the venue remained open for MICE events. Meanwhile, the newly-refurbished SPICE Aquatic Centre was opened to the public in 2016. Aside from these facilities, SPICE Canopy, the retail component of the project, was also completed in 2015.

A four-star hotel situated adjacent to these facilities is currently under construction. The hotel is scheduled for completion by 2019.

Facilities

SPICE Arena 
The arena's capacity is further boosted by the  Concourse at Level 3, which can sit a further 250 booths.

SPICE Convention & Exhibition Centre 
The new SPICE Convention & Exhibition Centre, which can accommodate up to 400 banquet tables or 8,000 theatre-style seats, complements the existing SPICE Arena in its role as a MICE venue. Its  grand foyer adds to its capacity by another 150 round tables. It also has 13 function rooms of varying sizes.

Notably, the GBI-certified SPICE Convention & Exhibition Centre is the world's first hybrid solar-powered convention centre, with electricity being generated from a  solar farm on the SPICE Aquatic Centre. The building incorporates energy conservation practices as well, with 654 energy-efficient light bulbs illuminating its roof. Moreover, the building houses the largest urban spice farm in Malaysia, which is sited at its rooftop along with a playground for special needs children.

SPICE Aquatic Centre 
The upgraded SPICE Aquatic Centre, which was opened in 2016, contains a wide variety of sports amenities, including an Olympic-sized swimming pool, a diving pool and a water them park for children, as well as badminton courts and squash courts. The centre also comes with function rooms, a cafe, a sports clinic and a swimming school.

The solar farm on the rooftop of the SPICE Aquatic Centre and the SPICE Canopy is the largest commercial solar photovoltaic farm in Penang, capable of generating up to 980MW hour of electricity in a single year.

SPICE Canopy 
The SPICE Canopy is the retail component of the renovation project by SP Setia. Launched in 2015, it consists of 59 leasable retail spaces.

Notable events 
The Penang International Science Fair is held at the arena every November.

QNET - VCON 2015/16/17/18/19 & 2022
G.E.M. – Queen of Hearts World Tour (30 June 2018)
Joker Xue – Skyscraper World Tour (14 February 2019)

References

External links

Southwest Penang Island District
Indoor arenas in Malaysia
Badminton venues in Malaysia
Squash venues in Malaysia
Sports venues in Penang
2000 establishments in Malaysia